Brasil, also known as Hy-Brasil and several other variants, is a phantom island said to lie in the Atlantic Ocean west of Ireland. Irish myths described it as cloaked in mist except for one day every seven years, when it becomes visible but still cannot be reached.

Etymology 
The etymology of the names Brasil and Hy-Brasil is unknown, but in Irish tradition it is thought to come from the Irish  (meaning "descendants (i.e., clan) of Bresail"), one of the ancient clans of northeastern Ireland. cf. Old Irish: : island; : beauty, worth, great, mighty.

Despite the similarity, the name of the country Brazil has no connection to the mythical islands (although J. R. R. Tolkien's essay "On Fairy Stories" linked them). The South American country was at first named Ilha de Vera Cruz (Island of the True Cross) and later Terra de Santa Cruz (Land of the Holy Cross) by the Portuguese navigators who arrived there. After some decades, it started to be called "Brazil" due to the exploitation of native brazilwood, at that time the only export of the land.

Appearance on maps 
Nautical charts identified an island called "Bracile" west of Ireland in the Atlantic Ocean as far back as 1325, in a portolan chart by Angelino Dulcert. It also appeared on the Catalan Atlas, in 1375.

This was identified for a time with the modern island of Terceira in the Azores, where a volcanic mount at the bay of its main town, Angra do Heroismo, is still named Monte Brasil.

A Catalan chart of about 1480 labels two islands "Illa de brasil", one to the south west of Ireland (where the mythical place was supposed to be) and one south of "Illa verde" or Greenland.

On maps the island was shown as being circular, often with a central strait or river running east–west across its diameter. Despite the failure of attempts to find it, this appeared regularly on maps lying south west of Galway Bay until 1865, by which time it was called Brasil Rock.

Map gallery

Searches for the island
Expeditions left Bristol in 1480 and 1481 to search for the island; and a letter written by Pedro de Ayala, shortly after the return of John Cabot (from his expedition in 1497), reports that land found by Cabot had been "discovered in the past by the men from Bristol who found Brasil".

In 1674, a Captain John Nisbet claimed to have seen the island when on a journey from France to Ireland, stating that the island was inhabited by large black rabbits and a magician who lived alone in a stone castle, yet the character and the story were a literary invention by Irish author Richard Head. Roderick O'Flaherty in A Chorographical Description of West or H-Iar Connaught (1684) tells us "There is now living, Morogh O'Ley (Murrough Ó Laoí), who imagines he was personally on O'Brasil for two days, and saw out of it the iles of Aran, Golamhead [by Lettermullen], Irrosbeghill, and other places of the west continent he was acquainted with."

As early as 1870 a paper was read to the Geological Society of Ireland suggesting this identification. The suggestion has since appeared more than once, e.g., in an 1883 edition of Notes and Queries.

In popular culture 
Irish poet Gerald Griffin wrote about Hy-Brasail in the early nineteenth century.

Mary Burke's short story uses the myth as an allegory of the breach caused by the Northern Irish Troubles. Mary Burke, “Hy-Brasil” in The Faber Best New Irish Short Stories, 2004-5 Ed. David Marcus. London: Faber & Faber, 2005, 101–05.

See also 

 Etymology of the country Brazil's name:
 Brazil § Etymology
 Name of Brazil
 Irish mythology in popular culture
 Inisheer
 Tech Duinn, a mythological island to the west of Ireland where souls go after death.
 Great Ireland, a similarly west-of-Ireland place, Irish myths of which are believed to have influenced the Vikings.

References

Further reading 
 
 
 Hy-Brasail by Gerald Griffin

Mythological islands
Phantom islands of the Atlantic
Irish mythology
Locations in Celtic mythology
Macaronesia